Reginald Jefferson Lawson (born August 2, 1997) is an American former professional baseball pitcher.

Amateur career
Lawson attended Victor Valley High School in Victorville, California. Lawson played in the 2015 Perfect Game All-American Classic. Lawson was a member of Team USA when they won Gold at the 2015 WBSC U-18 Baseball World Cup. He had committed to play college baseball at Arizona State University. Lawson was drafted by the San Diego Padres, with the 71st overall selection, in the Compensation Round B of the 2016 MLB draft. He signed with the Padres for a $1.9 million signing bonus.

Professional career
Lawson made his professional debut in 2016 with the AZL Padres of the Rookie-level Arizona League, going 0–0 with a 8.31 ERA and 7 strikeouts over  innings . He spent the 2017 season with the Fort Wayne TinCaps of the Class A Midwest League, going 4–6 with a 5.30 ERA and 89 strikeouts over 73 innings. Lawson spent the 2018 season with the Lake Elsinore Storm of the Class A-Advanced California League, going 8–5 with a 4.69 ERA and 117 strikeouts over 117 innings. In 2019, Lawson played for the Amarillo Sod Poodles of the Double-A Texas League, going 3–1 with a 5.20 ERA and 36 strikeouts over  innings . He appeared in just six games due to an elbow injury. Following the 2019 season, Lawson played for the Peoria Javelinas of the Arizona Fall League.

Lawson did not play a minor league game in 2020 due to the cancellation of the minor league season caused by the COVID-19 pandemic. He underwent Tommy John surgery in March 2020. On November 20, 2020, Lawson was added to the 40-man roster. Lawson missed a large portion of the 2021 season recovering from Tommy John, and pitched only  minor league innings, allowing 10 runs. He was outrighted off of the 40-man roster following the season on November 19, 2021. He announced his retirement on August 13, 2022.

References

External links

1997 births
Living people
Baseball players from California
Arizona League Padres players
Fort Wayne TinCaps players
Lake Elsinore Storm players
San Antonio Missions players
Amarillo Sod Poodles players